Joseph Stockhausen (born 25 June 1965) is a Jamaican sailor. He competed in the men's 470 event at the 1996 Summer Olympics.

References

External links
 

1965 births
Living people
Jamaican male sailors (sport)
Olympic sailors of Jamaica
Sailors at the 1996 Summer Olympics – 470
Place of birth missing (living people)